ABS  or Abs may refer to:

Arts and media

Broadcasting
 ABS (TV station), Australian Broadcasting Corporation's television station in Adelaide, Australia
 ABS network (Arab Broadcasting Services)
 Akita Broadcasting System, Japan
 Amalgamated Broadcasting System, former US radio network
 Alto Broadcasting System, a Philippines company later ABS-CBN

Music
 A.B.'s, a Japanese 1980s instrumental band
 American Bach Soloists, chamber music ensemble

Sports
 New Zealand national rugby union team. Nickname is All Blacks, A rugby national team in Oceania.
 Automated Balls and Strikes, an electronic system in baseball

Other media
 Abs Denham, a fictional character in Casualty

Organizations
 American Bible Society
 American Boy Scouts, an early Scouting organization
 American Bureau of Shipping, a shipping classification society
 Animal Behavior Society, an international organization
 Association of Broadcasting Staff, a former British broadcasting trade union
 Aston Business School, Birmingham, England, UK
 Australian Bureau of Statistics

Companies
 ABS Free Dish, a Bermuda-based television service
 ABS (satellite operator), Hamilton, Bermuda, formerly Asia Broadcast Satellite
 ABS Capital Partners, Baltimore, Maryland, US
 Alternative Bank Schweiz, Solothurn, Switzerland
 American Bladesmith Society
 ABS Global, formerly American Breeders Service
 ABS Building Society, Australia
 Acciaierie Bertoli Safau, an Italian steel mill
 ABS-CBN Corporation, a Philippine media and entertainment conglomerate.
 ABS-CBN, a Philippine television network.

Places
 Abu Simbel Airport (IATA airport code), Egypt
 Archbold Biological Station, a research institute in Florida, US
 Abs District, Hajjah Governorate, Yemen
 Abs (Yemen), a town

Science and technology
 Absolutive case, in interlinear glossing
 Absolute value, function in mathematics and computing
 Acrylonitrile butadiene styrene, a common plastics polymer
 Ammonium bisulfate, a byproduct formed in selective catalytic reduction systems when ammonia and urea react with sulfuric acid
 Adaptive bitrate streaming, in internet video
 Anti-lock braking system, in vehicles
 Arch Build System, in Arch Linux
 Automatic block signal, in US railroad signalling

Biology and medicine
 Rectus abdominis muscle ("abdominal muscle" or "abs") of humans and some mammals
 Amniotic band syndrome, a congenital disorder
 Cis-abienol synthase, an enzyme
 Ankaferd BloodStopper, an antihemorrhagic
 Auto-brewery syndrome, a medical condition where ethanol is produced within the digestive system
 Aqueous biphasic system, uses immiscibility of fluid matter to eliminate the problem of hydrocarbon volatility

Other uses
 Abs (surname), list of people with the name
 Ambonese Malay (ISO 639-3 code), a Malay creole of Indonesia
 Asset-backed security, in finance
 Nagoya Protocol on Access and Benefit Sharing, supplementary to the Convention on Biological Diversity
 Abdominal muscles (colloquial)

Telecommunications
 Aerial base station, flying antenna system